Rock Mills is an unincorporated community in Fayette County, in the U.S. state of Ohio.

History
Former variant names were Rockville and Walton. The first settlement was made near the site in 1815. A mill was later built there. Rock Mills has been noted for the rock deposits near the town site.

References

Unincorporated communities in Fayette County, Ohio
Unincorporated communities in Ohio